Enforcer is a Swedish heavy metal band formed in 2004 in Arvika.

Enforcer plays and performs in a style very similar to older speed metal bands like Venom and Anvil. When Sweden Rock Magazine asked them about playing "old school", they answered that heavy metal is not old school, it is timeless.

History 
Enforcer released their first album, Into the Night, through the Heavy Artillery label in November 2008.

Their second full-length album, Diamonds, was released under Earache Records on 24 May 2010 in Europe, while Heavy Artillery Records released the album in North America on 25 May 2010.

On 1 February 2013, Enforcer released Death by Fire, their third full-length album, in Stockholm. They headlined a Belgian release show along with Evil Invaders on 2 February.

In May 2022, Enforcer announced on Facebook that American Garth Condit will be their new bassist, following the departure of Tobias Lindqvist.

Musical style 
Enforcer is considered part of the new wave of traditional heavy metal (NWOTHM), an ongoing movement that in recent years has seen the return of traditional-sounding metal bands (similar to the Swedish glam metal revival). The name of the NWOTHM was inspired by the new wave of British heavy metal, which the movement strongly identifies with. Other bands considered part of the movement include Steelwing, White Wizzard, Cauldron, Holy Grail, Skull Fist and, more recently, Sons of Lioth.

Members 
Olof Wikstrand – lead vocals (2004–present), guitars (2004–2008, 2011–present), bass drums (2004–2007, 2007–2008, 2021–2022), drums (2004–2007, 2007–2008)
Jonas Wikstrand – drums (2006–2007, 2007-present), keyboards, piano, backing vocals (2006–present), bass (2006–2008)
Jonathan Nordwall – guitars, backing vocals (2019–present)
Garth Condit – bass (2022–present)

Live members
Chase Becker – bass (2019)
Jonny Nesta – guitars, backing vocals (2019)
Brian Wilson – drums, backing vocals (2019)

Past members
Adam Zaars – guitars (2006–2011)
Jakob Ljungberg – drums (2007)
Joseph Tholl – guitars (2007–2019) bass (2007–2008)
Tobias Lindqvist – bass (2008–2021)

Timeline

Discography 
Studio albums
Into the Night (2008)
Diamonds (2010)
Death by Fire (2013)
From Beyond (2015)
Zenith (2019)
Nostalgia (2023)

Live albums
Live by Fire (2015)
Live by Fire II (2021)

Singles and demos
"Evil Attacker" (2005) (demo)
"Evil Attacker c/w Mistress from Hell" (2007)
"Night Walker/Take Me to Hell" (2011)
"High Roller/Back on the Road" (2011)
"Mesmerized by Fire" (2013)
"At The End of The Rainbow" (2021)

Others
"Nightmare Over the UK (2010) (split album with Cauldron)"

Music videos

References

External links

2004 establishments in Sweden
Musical groups established in 2004
Musical quartets
Speed metal musical groups
Swedish heavy metal musical groups